Imambad is a neighbourhood of Siddipet in the Medak district of the Indian state of Telangana.

References 

Siddipet